The 1959 World Table Tennis Championships mixed doubles was the 25th edition of the mixed doubles championship.  

Ichiro Ogimura and Fujie Eguchi defeated Teruo Murakami and Kimiyo Matsuzaki in the final by three sets to nil.

Results

See also
 List of World Table Tennis Championships medalists

References

-